Drakensberg Dragons is a South Africa field hockey club. The club was established in 2016, and is one of 6 established to compete in South African Hockey Association's new premier domestic competition, Premier Hockey League.

History
The Drakensberg Dragons have been inspired by famous tourist areas in uKhahlamba-Drakensberg Park in KwaZulu-Natal.

Tournament history

Premier Hockey League
 2016 - 6th
 2017 - 
 2018 -
 2019 -

Teams
The men's team was announced on 10 July 2019.

Head Coach: Siphesihle Ntuli

References

Field hockey clubs in South Africa
Field hockey clubs established in 2016
2016 establishments in South Africa
Premier Hockey League (South Africa)